Lucas Espindola da Silva is a Brazilian professional footballer who play as a striker for Malaysia Super League club Sri Pahang.

Club career
On 23 August 2016, Lucas was announced to have signed with Hong Kong club Tai Po.

On 23 May 2017, Lucas was poached by fellow Hong Kong Club Kitchee. After two and half seasons at the club, on 20 December 2019, Lucas has left Kitchee due to personal issue.

On 1 January 2020, Eastern announced that they had signed Lucas with a contract that expires on 30 June 2021.

In early 2022, Lucas Joined Brusque.

On 27 June 2022, he joined Penang FC.

Honours 
Eastern
 Hong Kong FA Cup: 2019–20
Hong Kong Sapling Cup: 2020–21

Kitchee
 Hong Kong Premier League: 2017–18, 2019–2020
 Hong Kong Senior Shield: 2018–19
 Hong Kong FA Cup: 2017–18, 2018–19
 Hong Kong Sapling Cup: 2017–18, 2019–20
Hong Kong Community Cup: 2017, 2018
Taipo

 Hong Kong Sapling Cup: 2016–17

Career Statistics

Club 
Updated on 19 May 2021

References

External links
 
 Lucas Espindola da Silva at HKFA
 

Brazilian footballers
1990 births
Living people
Sportspeople from Rio Grande do Sul
Hong Kong Premier League players
South China AA players
Tai Po FC players
Kitchee SC players
Eastern Sports Club footballers
Association football forwards
Expatriate footballers in Hong Kong